Martijn Kleermaker (born February 19, 1991) is a Dutch professional darts player, currently playing in Professional Darts Corporation events.

PDC
He announced that he intended to compete at Q School 2020, speaking to RTL7 saying that the 2019 World Masters was a 'catastrophe'.

Kleermaker won a PDC Tour Card for the first time at European Q School in 2020. He played on the ProTour since 2020. In his first year in PDC, he took part in 2020 UK Open, where he lost in the first round. Martijn qualified for three out of four European Tour events in 2020 and secured his spot in 2020 European Championship, where he defeated Rob Cross 6-3 in the first round, losing to Devon Petersen 8-10 in the second round. From 39th place on Players Championship Order of Merit Kleermaker also qualified for 2020 Players Championship Finals, where he lost in the deciding leg 5-6 to Gabriel Clemens in the first round. Because of a positive COVID-19-test Kleermaker had to withdraw from the 2021 PDC World Darts Championship. After the first year with the Tour card, he was 74th in the PDC Order of Merit.

In 2021 he made it to the last 16 in 2021 UK Open, winning over Wayne Jones, Martin Schindler, Jamie Hughes and Callan Rydz, losing to Luke Humphries 4-10. Later on in the yeat Kleermaker made his debut on 2021 World Grand Prix, where he lost 0-2 on sets to Mervyn King. From 35th place on Players Championship Order of Merit he qualified for 2021 Players Championship Finals, losing in the deciding leg 5-6 to Scott Mitchell. 

After withdrawal in 2021, Kleermaker debuted on 2022 PDC World Darts Championship and made it to last 16 after wins over John Michael, Simon Whitlock and Joe Cullen, then losing 0-4 on sets to James Wade. After two years with the Tour card, he placed 40th in PDC Order of Merit, securing his place for 2022.

In 2022 UK Open Martijn was seeded in the third round, where he lost to Jason Heaver 5-6.

World Championship results

BDO
 2020: Second round (lost to Paul Hogan 1–4)

PDC
 2022: Fourth round (lost to James Wade 0–4)
 2023: Second round (lost to Chris Dobey 0–3)

Performance timeline

BDO

PDC

PDC European Tour

References

External links

1991 births
Living people
Dutch darts players
British Darts Organisation players
Professional Darts Corporation current tour card holders
People from Harderwijk
Sportspeople from Gelderland